X44 or X-44 may refer to:

Agent X44, 2007 Star Cinema film starring Vhong Navarro as Agent X44 with Mariel Rodriguez in her film debut
Lockheed Martin X-44 MANTA (Multi-Axis No-Tail Aircraft), a conceptual aircraft design by Lockheed Martin that has been studied by NASA and the U.S. Air Force
Lockheed Martin X-44 (UAV), an unmanned aerial vehicle by Lockheed Martin, unrelated to the X-44 MANTA
Team X44, an Extreme E electric offroad rally racing team founded by Lewis Hamilton

See also

 X4 (disambiguation)
 44 (disambiguation)
 X (disambiguation)